Marie Thérèse "Andrée" Brabant (1901–1989) was a French film actress. She played a number of leading roles during the silent era.

Selected filmography
 Le droit à la vie (1917)
 The Zone of Death (1917)
 Flipotte (1920)
 The Secret of Polichinelle (1923)
 Princess Masha (1927)
 The Marriage of Mademoiselle Beulemans (1927)
 Madame Récamier (1928)
 Cousin Bette (1928)
 Fire in the Straw (1939)
 That Tender Age (1964)

References

Bibliography 
 Goble, Alan. The Complete Index to Literary Sources in Film. Walter de Gruyter, 1999.

External links 
 

1901 births
1989 deaths
French film actresses
French silent film actresses
20th-century French actresses
Actors from Reims